Kajol is an Indian actress known for her work in Hindi films. As of 2021, she has received 23 awards, including six Filmfare Awards, five Screen Awards, four Zee Cine Awards, and one each Stardust Award and Bengal Film Journalists' Association Awards, and Bollywood Movie Award.

After making her debut in 1992 with the romance Bekhudi, Kajol received critical acclaim and the Bengal Film Journalists' Association Award for Best Actress for playing an orphaned girl in Udhaar Ki Zindagi (1994). She won her first Filmfare Award for Best Actress for her portrayal of an Indian non-resident in the romantic drama Dilwale Dulhania Le Jayenge (1995), and Best Performance in a Negative Role for her performance as a femme fatale in the psychological thriller Gupt: The Hidden Truth (1997), becoming the first actress to win in the latter category. Additionally, she received the Zee Cine Award for Best Actor – Female for Gupt.

Kajol was nominated for Best Actress at Filmfare for her 1998 films: Dushman, Pyaar To Hona Hi Tha and Kuch Kuch Hota Hai, winning the award for the lattermost. Her performance as twin sisters in Dushman also won her a first Screen Award for Best Actress, while for her portrayal of a tomboy in Kuch Kuch Hota Hai she earned Best Actress trophies for Bollywood Movie and Zee Cine Awards. Kajol set the record for most Filmfare Award for Best Actress wins with five after earning the trophies for her performances as a spirited Punjabi girl in Kabhi Khushi Kabhie Gham... (2001), a blind Kashmiri woman in Fanaa (2006), and a career woman in My Name Is Khan (2010).

Along with acting awards, Kajol was honoured with the Rajiv Gandhi Award for her contribution to Indian cinema in 2002. In 2007, she received Karamveer Puraskar, presented by the Mumbai Pradesh Young Congress, for her social work of helping the education of unpriveleged children. She was fetched the Padma Shri, the fourth highest civilian award, by the government of India in 2011.

Awards and nominations

State honours

References

External links
 

Lists of awards received by Indian actor